Saadat may refer to:

People 
 Saadat Ali Khan I
 Saadat Ali Khan II
 Saadat Hasan Manto
 Saadat Saeed

Places 
 Sa'adat Abad
 Saadat, Iran

See also 

 
 Anwar El Sadat
 Sadat (disambiguation)
 Sadat